Regio Centurion Private School is an Afrikaans and English Primary School in Clubview, Centurion, South Africa. The school opened in 2006. It also includes a nursery school where the same teaching philosophy is used to prepare the children for primary school.

History
In 2004, parents approached Elsie Calitz to help them start a primary school. She agreed on the terms that it would be part of a nursery school. The Regio Centurion Schools were started in 2006. The teaching approach is based on the philosophy of the Reggio Emilia schools in the north of Italy and was adapted to South African circumstances.

Curriculum
The curriculum followed is the official curriculum of the Department of Basic Education, though the teaching method, based on the teaching philosophy of Loris Malaguzzi and Elsie Calitz, differs radically from conventional teaching methods.

References
 

Private schools in Gauteng
City of Tshwane Metropolitan Municipality